Joseph Blair McGuire,  (born June 20, 1944) is a Canadian retired politician. A native of in Morell, Prince Edward Island, he served as the Member of Parliament (MP) for the riding of Egmont from 1988 to 2008. A member of the Liberal Party of Canada, was first elected to the House of Commons in 1988 and reelected in 1993, 1997, 2000, 2004 and 2006. From 2003 to 2006, he was Minister for the Atlantic Canada Opportunities Agency in the Cabinet of Prime Minister Paul Martin.

Before entering public life, McGuire worked as a teacher in Prince Edward Island and a vice-principal at an elementary school in Ontario. He was also a community development worker having been employed with the PEI Rural Development Council and the Community Employment Strategy. He later worked for then Egmont Member of Parliament George Henderson, as well as then Premier of Prince Edward Island, Joe Ghiz.

On March 7, 2007, McGuire announced he would not run in the next federal election, choosing to retire from politics. McGuire studied at Prince of Wales College for Teacher's Training and obtained a Bachelor of Arts at St. Dunstan's University. He and his wife, Mary, have two children, Moira and Matthew.

Electoral record

References

External links
 

1944 births
Living people
Canadian people of Irish descent
People from Kings County, Prince Edward Island
Members of the House of Commons of Canada from Prince Edward Island
Liberal Party of Canada MPs
Members of the King's Privy Council for Canada
People from Summerside, Prince Edward Island
Prince of Wales College alumni
Saint Dunstan's University alumni
Members of the 27th Canadian Ministry